The following lists the top 25 singles of 2004  in Australia from the Australian Recording Industry Association (ARIA) End of Year singles chart.
"What About Me" by Shannon Noll was the biggest song of the year, peaking at #1 for four weeks and staying in the top 50 for 14 weeks. The longest stay at #1 was by Maroon 5 with She Will Be Loved, and it stayed at number one for 5 weeks.

Notes

References

Australian record charts
2004 in Australian music
2004 record charts